was a town located in Higashiyamanashi District, Yamanashi Prefecture, Japan.

As of 2003, the town had an estimated population of 7,689 and a density of 558.39 persons per km². The total area was 13.77 km².

History 
On October 12, 2004, Kasugai, along the towns of Ichinomiya, Isawa, Misaka and Yatsushiro, and the village of Sakaigawa (all from Higashiyatsushiro District), was merged to create the city of Fuefuki.

External links
 Official website of Fuefuki in Japanese (English portions)

Dissolved municipalities of Yamanashi Prefecture
Fuefuki, Yamanashi